The Polícia Militar do Estado de São Paulo (São Paulo State Military Police) is a law enforcement agency (Military Police (Brazil)) of the military kind in the state of São Paulo, Brazil. It is the largest state police force in the country, with over 100,000 personnel in its ranks, distributed across several battalions all over the state as well as within the Greater São Paulo region (Grande São Paulo) which itself comprises 40 cities and towns.

Despite being called "Military Police", it should not be confused with the Military Police for the Armed Forces, which are the Army Police (Brazil) (Polícia do Exército), the Air Force Police (Polícia da Aeronáutica) and the Police Company of the Naval Battalion (Companhia de Polícia do Batalhão Naval). Its role is rather more similar to the state defense forces and National Guard in the United States. 

The first militarized police in Portugal (when Brazil was still a colony) was the Royal Guard of the Lisbon Police (Portuguese: Guarda Real de Polícia de Lisboa), established in 1801, which followed the model of the National Gendarmerie (French: Gendarmerie Nationale) of France, created in 1791.

In Brazil, State Military Police Officers are considered military personnel by the Brazilian constitution, however, they perform police duties among civilian populations. It certain cases, they can also act as reserve forces for the Brazilian Army.

Under the United Nations, in cooperation with the Brazilian Army, the Military Police of São Paulo State has served in Angola, Mozambique, East-Timor, Sudan, and Haiti.

Mission and organization

Its primary function is to perform the patrolling of public places such as city streets, state highways and forests in the entire state and also authority escorting, intelligence and reconnaissance (P2) and crime prevention duties. São Paulo Fire Fighters belongs to PMESP and are equally structured as a state police organization.

The PMESP is further divided into specialized units as follows:

Police Cavalry Regiment "July 9th" is one of the most traditional Units of the Military Police of São Paulo State. Actually, it dates from the origins of the militia in the State, because when the Permanent Municipal Guard was created, on December 15, 1831, by the Brigadier Rafael Tobias de Aguiar, thirty men were designated for making up a "Cavalry Section". Nowadays, the Regiment "July 9th" is a special organ of execution, under the Command of Conflict Policing, aiming at preserving the public order in the whole state territory, in Rural and Urban Special Actions, as well as controlling tumults. Helping with the activities of Social and Cultural Communication, by means of the Fanfare Band, of the Horseback Riding School, of the Carrousel, of the Center of Horse therapy, of the Equestrian Sport and, mainly, of the Preventive Ostensible Policing with horses.
1°BPChq ROTA – Nowadays it is subordinated to the Shock Policing Command, having, as its main mission, the control of civil commotions and urban contra-guerrilla. Furthermore, the Unit executes the ostensible motorized patrolling denominated " ROTA " (Ostensive Patrols Tobias de Aguiar), seeking for the prevention and the repression of criminality in support to the Battalions of Area, saturating the areas of larger criminal rates. The ROTA is a tactical force that makes versatility, flexibility and strong reaction capacity possible. It's a reserve troop of the General Command of the Military Police of São Paulo State.
2°BPChq Anchieta – The 2nd Battalion of Shock Troops has the following missions: Control of Civil Commotions; Policing in Sports Areas; Policing during Artistic and cultural Events; ROCAM (Ostensible Patrol with Motorcycles).
3°BPChq Humaitá – Policing by foot and with vehicles, inspecting prisons, vehicles carrying valuable things, parades, military and funereal honors.
4°BPChq Operações Especiais – 
Commandos and Special Operations - Operations in high-complexity environments such as rural, forest, mountain and cavernous areas, as well as favelas and combat diving; escorting of valuable armaments. 
Group of Special Tactical Actions – occurrences with hostages and bomb disposal.
5°BPChq Canil;- K-9 Unit
Fire Brigade of PMESP – The creation of the Fire Brigade in São Paulo is dated March 10, 1880, as consequence of the disastrous fire on February 15 of that year, which destroyed the library and the file of the College of Law located then in the San Francisco Convent, at a traditional square in São Paulo City. Thus, in an incipient way, a long and difficult path had begun and it was by the spirit of sacrifice, by courage, by heroism and by the will of helping other people, examples of dedication and professionalism that crown the history of this Centennial Corporation, whose most important objective is to preserve life, property and the environment.
São Paulo Highway Patrol – Traffic Highway Policing is executed on state highways to instruct the users to follow the traffic rules and regulations based on international standards highway security. It consists of the execution of inspection services, patrolling and traffic control, comprehending the following activities: policing in traffic lights, attending traffic occurrences, policing in special events, solemnities, escorting during dignitaries' visits, popular celebrations, sports competitions on streets, instructing students, escorting vehicles and drivers. The Highway Policing is managed for 5 battalions distributed alongside São Paulo Stadual Highways.
GRPAe João Negrão – The Military Police of São Paulo State, the pioneer of the aviation in Brazil during the first decade of the last century, has contributed with important services to the society of São Paulo State and to the rest of the country in the use of its aircraft until the thirties, when it was extinct. With the evolution and development of the City of São Paulo, the largest and most important metropolis of South America, an increase and rising of the criminality has occurred, and the use of high technology in order to provide safety to society is necessary. Thus, the Military Police incorporated an agile, efficient and effective equipment for combating criminality: the helicopter "Eagle Uno", which had the mission to support the PM in all its activities. The date was August 15, 1984, and Aerial Radiopatrol Grouping was officially created. Their mandate is to uphold criminal law and enforce peace and order in the 247,000 km2 (95408 sq mi) of state territory, as well as to provide security to the state Governor and his family as well as state government buildings. They have at their disposal several helicopters such as the Helibras HB-350 Esquilo under the Águia (eagle) codename.

History

The police force was founded by Brigadier General Rafael Tobias de Aguiar on December 15, 1831, originally as the São Paulo Municipal Imperial Guard. The MPSP of today was raised in 1935 as a result of its involvement in the Constitutionalist Revolution of 1932.

Weapons

Pistols
Taurus RT827S in .38SPL This weapon has been retired since January 2011, and the complete substitution by the .40 pistols has been completed in March 2011.
Taurus PT24/7 PRO LS in .40
Taurus PT100 in .40
Taurus PT101 in .40
Taurus PT640 - Subcompact pistol for concealed carry while on intelligence duties.
Glock G22 (.40SW) in substitution for Taurus pistols since 2019

Shotguns

Remington 870
Pump CBC 12
Benelli M4

Submachine guns

B&T APC40 PRO
Beretta M12 (under the name model of Beretta M972 in Brazil)
H&K MP5SD3
H&K MP5A2
TAURUS/FAMAE .40

Carbines
FAMAE CT-30

Assault rifles

IMBEL IA2
Colt M16A2
Colt M4A1
FN FAL
FN SCAR

Sniper Rifles

SSG M1
FN Model 30-11
IMBEL AGLC
AR10A4 Super SASS used by ROTA, GATE and COE
HK PSG1
Barrett M82 (used to defend maximum security prisional facilities from helicopters that may attempt to extract inmates)

Machine Guns

IWI Negev - in use since 2020 for special operations

Vehicles inventory

Notable officers

Conte Lopes, now a political representative, was a commanding officer (ranked as captain) behind the famous ROTA units in the 1970s and 1980s.

Cel. Ubiratan Guimarães, the commanding officer of the police operation resulting in the Carandiru massacre, was a high-ranked officer in the PMESP ranks (ranked as colonel).

See also 

 Museum of the Military Police of the State of São Paulo
 Rondas Ostensivas Tobias de Aguiar - 1st Shock Police Battalion, PMESP's elite ostensive patrol unit
 Comandos e Operações Especiais - 1st, 2nd and 3rd Companies of the 4th Shock Police Battalion, PMESP's counter-terrorism unit
 Grupo de Ações Táticas Especiais - 4th, 5th and 6th Companies of the 4th Shock Police Battalion, PMESP's hostage rescue unit

References

Sao Paulo
Gendarmerie
1831 establishments in South America
Organisations based in São Paulo (state)